Maharajganj is a Community development block in district of Siwan, in Bihar state of India. It is one out of 6 blocks of Maharajganj Subdivision. The headquarter of the block is at Maharajganj town.

The block is divided into one Nagar Panchayat and many Village Councils and villages.

Panchayats
Maharajganj block is divided into one Nagar Panchayat (City council) and many Gram panchayats (Village councils).

Maharajganj (city council)
Balau
Balia
Deoria
Hajpurwa
Jigrahawa
Kasdeura
Madhopur
Paterha
Pokhara
Risaura
Sarangpur
Shivdah
Sikatia
Takipur
Teghra
Tewtha

See also
Administration in Bihar

References

Community development blocks in Siwan district